Eduardo E. Cintrón Suárez is a Puerto Rican politician and a former mayor of Guayama. Cintrón was affiliated with the Popular Democratic Party (PPD).

In 2022, Cintrón-Suárez pleaded guilty to engaging in a bribery scheme in which he received cash payments in exchange for executing municipal contracts and approving invoice payments for an asphalt and paving company. A federal district judge sentenced Eduardo Cintrón to 30 months in prison

Education 
Eduardo E. Cintrón Suárez completed his bachelor's degree in business administration at the Pontifical Catholic University of Puerto Rico Guayama campus, and  also completed a master's degree in business and administration at the University of Turabo.

References

Living people
Mayors of places in Puerto Rico
Popular Democratic Party (Puerto Rico) politicians
Pontifical Catholic University of Puerto Rico alumni
People from Guayama, Puerto Rico
1967 births